The Leicestershire Women's cricket team, officially the Leicestershire and Rutland Women's cricket team since 2010, is the women's representative cricket team for the English historic counties of Leicestershire and Rutland. They play their home games at various grounds across the two counties, often in Loughborough, Leicester or Empingham. They are captained by Katie Winterton. In 2019, they played in Division Three of the final season of the Women's County Championship, and have since competed in the Women's Twenty20 Cup. They are partnered with the East Midlands regional side Lightning.

History
Leicestershire Women played their first recorded match in 1948, against Buckinghamshire Women. They also played a match against a touring Australia side in 1951, as a combined team with Buckinghamshire. Leicestershire joined the national women's cricket structure in 2004, competing in the County Challenge Cup, the lower tier of the Women's County Championship: they finished bottom of their group in their first season. After this, Leicestershire remained in the lower levels of the Championship. They won their Division 5 group two years in a row, in 2010 and 2011, and after this have mainly played in Division Three. They did gain promotion from Division Three in 2015, coming second, but were relegated the following season.

In the Women's Twenty20 Cup, Leicestershire have had some successful seasons in the lower divisions of the competition: for example, they went unbeaten in 2015 and 2016. Between 2017 and 2019, they played in Division Three. In 2021, they competed in the East Midlands Group of the Twenty20 Cup, finishing 5th with 2 victories. In 2022 they finished third in Group 5 of the Twenty20 Cup, before beating Oxfordshire and Northamptonshire on Finals Day to win their group. They also joined the East of England Women's County Championship in 2022, finishing third out of seven in their first season.

Players

Current squad
Based on appearances in the 2022 season.

Notable players
Players who have played for Leicestershire and played internationally are listed below, in order of first international appearance (given in brackets):

 Sonia Odedra (2014)

Seasons

Women's County Championship

Women's Twenty20 Cup

Honours
 Women's Twenty20 Cup:
 Group winners (1) – 2022

See also
 Leicestershire County Cricket Club
 Lightning (women's cricket)

References

Cricket in Leicestershire
Women's cricket teams in England